Alophosoma is a genus of moths of the family Noctuidae described by Turner in 1929.

Species
 Alophosoma emmelopis (Turner, 1929)
 Alophosoma hypoxantha (Lower, 1902)
 Alophosoma pallidula Turner, 1936
 Alophosoma syngenes Turner, 1929

References

Catocalinae
Noctuoidea genera